Øivind Kiel Johannessen (21 September 1924 – 11 May 1996) was a Norwegian football player and manager. As a player, Johannessen spent his career playing as a goalkeeper for Sandefjord BK and Skeid.

Johannessen was capped four times for Norway before he retired as a player in 1960. He was the manager of the Norway national football team from 1970 till 1971 and the first to select the Norway national team personally, not involving a selecting committee.

Playing career 

Johannessen was born in Sandefjord. He started playing as a for local top division club Sandefjord BK in 1949. In 1951, he had a short spell in Skeid, before returning to Sandefjord Ballklubb. In the following season, Johannessen returned to Skeid where he stayed for the rest of his career. While at Skeid, Johannessen won the Norwegian Cup four times; in 1954, 1955, 1956 and 1958. Skeid won a silver medal in the league in the 1957–58 Hovedserien. He retired in 1960.

Johannessen was capped four times for Norway. On 2 October 1949, he got his international debut in a 3–3 draw against Sweden. He got his fourth and final appearance on 5 October 1952, in a 2–1 defeat to Sweden. In addition, Johannessen got five appearances for the Norway B team.

Coaching career
Johannessen started his coaching career in Vålerengen in 1963. He moved on to Skeid in 1965, a year the club won the Norwegian Cup. He coached Norway's junior team in the period 1967–69. In 1970, Johannessen succeeded Wilhelm Kment as head coach for the Norway senior team. He led Norway in a total of 17 matches of which Norway won four. Johannessen was replaced by George Curtis in the beginning of the year 1972. He was head coach at third tier club Drafn in the 1972 season. Johannessen returned as head coach for Vålerengen in 1974, a position he left at the end of the 1975 season.

Honours

Player
Skeid
Norwegian Cup: 1954, 1955, 1956, 1958

Manager
Skeid
Norwegian Cup: 1965

Managerial statistics
Sources:

References

External links 

 
Øyvind Kiel Johannessen national team profile (NFF)

1924 births
1996 deaths
Norwegian footballers
Norway international footballers
Sandefjord BK players
Skeid Fotball players
Norwegian football managers
Skeid Fotball managers
Vålerenga Fotball managers
Norway national football team managers
Association football goalkeepers
People from Sandefjord
Sportspeople from Vestfold og Telemark